Spectacle Island is a  island located in Australia's Hawkesbury River near its junction with Mooney Mooney Creek, to the north of Sydney, New South Wales. It is within the bounded locality of Mooney Mooney.

The island was originally known as 'Goat Island', named after a herd of goats that were once kept on the island. Apparently other domesticated animals were also marooned here, as there is one report of an omnivorous cow consuming two flatheads that it had pulled down from a tree where the fisherman had left them to dry, probably in order to supplement the meagre amount of pasture that was available.

The name of the island was subsequently changed to Spectacle, although the reason is unclear. It may have been due to the spectacular view from its summit, or maybe due to its resemblance to a monocle.

The island was designated a nature reserve in 1972 and was listed on the Register of the National Estate in 1978 for its scientific importance as a remnant of the natural environment of Sydney, for the abundance of aboriginal sites it contains, and particularly diverse vegetation. It is managed by the NSW National Parks and Wildlife Service.

Spectacle Island was included on the Australian National Heritage List in December 2006.

References 

Islands of New South Wales
Central Coast (New South Wales)
Australian National Heritage List
Hawkesbury River
River islands of Australia